Giorgos (also mentioned as Yorgos or Georges) Ioannou (1926 –  2017) was a Greek artist born in Athens. He is considered to have been one of the main representatives of the Pop Art movement in Greece.

In his work by adopting the main aspects of pop art and utilizing the techniques employed by comic books, he turned to satirizing social and political reality, creating compositions with a surrealistic atmosphere and symbolic allusions.

References 

 National Gallery, Greece Giorgos Ioannou
 iset - Contemporary Greek Art Institute - Giorgos Ioannou
 Αρχείο Τ. Σπητέρη - Φάκελοι Καλλιτεχνών, Γιώργος Ιωάννου , Τελλόγλειο Ίδρυμα Τεχνών, Α.Π.Θ.
 Π.Δ.Καγκελάρη, Γιώργος Ιωάννου Αναζητήσεις στη Σύγχρονη Ελληνική Ζωγραφική - Η Συλλογή Καγκελάρη, τόμ.2, Έκδοση πρώτη, Αθήνα 1999, 
 Λεξικό Ελλήνων Καλλιτεχνών, τόμος 2, (Θ-Λ), Zωγράφοι-Γλύπτες-Χαράκτες, 16ος - 20ός αιώνας (εκδ.Μέλισσα 2000) 
 Giorgos / Georges Ioannou (official site)

External links
Giorgos Ioannou National Gallery
iset - Contemporary Greek Art Institute - Giorgos Ioannou
Αρχείο Τ. Σπητέρη - Φάκελοι Καλλιτεχνών - Γιώργος Ιωάννου
CONTEMPORARY GREEK PAINTING THE CANGELARIS COLLECTION
Exhibition "Giorgos Ioannou, Album 1940-1974" (BCU, November 2016-January 2017)
Giorgos Ioannou (official site)

1926 births
2017 deaths
Pop artists
Greek painters
Greek contemporary artists
Artists from Athens